St Cecilia's Convent Secondary School (SCCSS),  (SMK Konven St. Cecilia), is a secondary school in Sandakan, Sabah, Malaysia. Its Ministry of Education code is XFE2037.

Nearby schools are the SM St. Mary's (boys secondary school), SR St. Mary's Boys, SR St. Mary's Convent, SR St. Mary and SMJK Tiong Hua. It is also near to the Duchess of Kent General Hospital and the local Polyclinic. Students of St Cecilia's are known as "Cecilians". It is one of the 30 Convent secondary schools in Malaysia.

History
St Cecilia's was founded in 1963 as a primary school under Rev Mother St. Leonard. It was one of a number of schools in Sabah staffed by the Sisters of the Little Company of Mary, also known as the "Blue Sisters". In 1966 it became the first girls' secondary school in Sandakan. The primary school was closed and its students transferred to SR St. Mary's Convent, one of St Cecilia's present-day feeder schools.

School Song

References

External links
 School Website

Schools in Sabah
Secondary schools in Malaysia
Catholic schools in Malaysia